104th Regiment or 104th Infantry Regiment may refer to:

 104th Infantry Regiment (United States), a unit of the United States Army from Springfield, Massachusetts
 104th Ohio Infantry, a unit of the United States Army during the American Civil War
 104th Training Aviation Regiment, a unit of the Yugoslav Air Force
 104th Operational Maneuvers Regiment, a unit of the Algerian Army
 104th Aviation Regiment, a unit of the United States Army
Several infantry regiments of the British Army listed at 104th Regiment of Foot (disambiguation)

See also
 104th Division (disambiguation)